Cham-e Yusefali (also Romanized as Cham-e Yūsef‘alī and Cham-e Yūsof ‘Alī) is a village in Cham Kuh Rural District, Bagh-e Bahadoran District, Lenjan County, Isfahan Province, Iran. At the 2006 census, its population was 1,630, in 380 families.

References 

Populated places in Lenjan County